Oreoleuciscus humilis is a species of cyprinid in the genus Oreoleuciscus. It inhabits Mongolia and Russia.

References

Cyprinid fish of Asia
Fish of Russia
Fish of Mongolia
Fish described in 1889